William Powell (1892–1984) was an American actor.

William, Willie, Bill or Billy Powell may also refer to:

Sports
William Powell (gridiron football) (born 1988), CFL running back
Bill Powell (baseball) (1885–1967), pitcher in Major League Baseball
William Powell (cricketer) (1885–1954), first-class cricketer
Billy Powell (footballer) (1901–1981), English footballer
Willie Powell (1903–1987), Negro league baseball player
William Powell (baseball) (1919–2004), Negro league baseball player

Politicians
William Edward Powell (1788–1854), Welsh Conservative politician, member of parliament for Cardiganshire
William E. Powell (born 1934), American politician from the state of Florida
William Powell (Canadian politician) (1907–1992), mayor of Hamilton, Ontario
William Powell (MP for Corby) (1948–2022), Conservative member of parliament in the United Kingdom
Sir William Powell, 1st Baronet (c. 1624–1680), English member of parliament for Herefordshire
William Powell (Liberal Democrat politician), Welsh Liberal Democrat member of the National Assembly for Wales
William Thomas Rowland Powell (1815–1878), Welsh Conservative politician, member of parliament for Cardiganshire
William Frederick Powell (1826–1889), political figure in Ontario, Canada
William Powell (Virginia colonist) (died 1623), Virginia colonist, landowner, militia officer and politician

Military
William G. Powell (1871–1955), Marine Corps Brevet Medal recipient
William Henry Powell (soldier) (1825–1904), American Civil War general

Musicians
William Powell (singer) (1942–1977), lead vocalist of The O'Jays, Rock And Roll Hall Of Fame Inductee
Billy Powell (1952–2009), American musician

Priests
William Powell (Archdeacon of Bath) (died 1612), Anglican priest
William Powell (Archdeacon of Chester) (died 1751), British Anglican priest
William Powell (Archdeacon of Colchester) (1717–1775), academic and priest

Others
Benjaman Kyle (born 1948), amnesiac
William Dummer Powell (1755–1834), Chief Justice of Upper Canada
William Powell (English actor) (1735–1769), English actor
William Henry Powell (1823–1879), American artist
William Henry Powell (architect) (1847–1900), English architect
William Powell (author) (1949–2016), author of The Anarchist Cookbook
William S. Powell (1919–2015), historian of North Carolina
Alleged English name for Seminole fighter Osceola
Bill Powell (golf course owner) (1916–2009), American businessman, entrepreneur, and pioneering golf course owner
William David Powell (1925–1968), American television writer, son of the actor
William J. Powell (1897–1942), American civil aviator and author
William J. Powell (attorney) (born 1960), U.S. Attorney for the Northern District of West Virginia
William Bramwell Powell (1836–1904), American educator, author and superintendent of schools

See also
William Nowland Van Powell (surname Van Powell), American architect, painter, and historian